Polina Pavlovna Bolgareva (born 6 February 1999) is a Russian ice hockey forward and member of the Russian national ice hockey team, currently playing in the Zhenskaya Hockey League (ZhHL) with Dinamo-Neva Saint Petersburg.

Bolgareva represented the Russian Olympic Committee (ROC) in the women's ice hockey tournament at the 2022 Winter Olympics in Beijing.

Playing career
At age 17, Bolgareva made her ZhHL debut with SKIF Nizhny Novgorod in the 2016–17 season. After two and a half seasons with SKIF, she signed with Dinamo-Neva Saint Petersburg midway through the 2018–19 season. She is a two-time ZhHL All-Star selection.

International play
As a junior player with the Russian national under-18 team, Bolgareva participated at the IIHF U18 Women's World Championships in 2014, 2015, 2016, and 2017, winning bronze medals at the 2015 and 2017 tournaments. 

She was a member of the Russian Olympic Committee team at the 2022 Winter Olympics and scored a hat-trick against  in the ROC's opening game of the group stage. After testing positive for COVID-19 following the group stage match against , Bolgareva did not appear in the final game of the group stage against  nor the quarterfinal rematch against Switzerland.

References

External links
 
 

1999 births
Living people
Ice hockey players at the 2022 Winter Olympics
Russian women's ice hockey forwards
Olympic ice hockey players of Russia
Sportspeople from Moscow Oblast
People from Balashikha
HC SKIF players